(1874–1940) was a Japanese zoologist, geologist, and palaeontologist.

Biography
Shigeyasu was born in Atago, Tokyo in Meiji 7 (1874). His father was a private secretary to the Shimazu clan, while his paternal grandfather had served the Satsuma Domain in Edo. His maternal grandfather was the pharmacologist , his maternal uncle the chemist .

In 1894, Shigeyasu enrolled as a student in the Department of Zoology at the Imperial University, Tokyo, where he also attended lectures and classes in the Department of Geology.

He went on to conduct geological surveys of Karafuto, the Ryūkyū Islands, Taiwan, Korea, and China, with coal a particular specialism. From 1910 he was professor in the Faculty of Science and Engineering at Waseda University.

Besides his scientific career, Tokunaga was a devotee of Noh: he studied under the sōke of the Hōshō school and performed on stage over three hundred times, particularly in plays of the fourth and fifth categories, appearing in later life also in elderly female roles in plays including Sotoba Komachi. His wife edited volumes of tanka, while their eldest son  was a specialist in Hungarian literature and professor at Tokyo University of Foreign Studies. Tokunaga died in 1940 at the age of 67, according to the traditional system of age reckoning.

References

External links
 Tokunaga Shigeyasu (Japan Paleobiology Database)

Japanese paleontologists
1874 births
1940 deaths
People from Tokyo
University of Tokyo alumni